Darshan Upadhyaya, better known mononymously as Darshan, (formerly ZionSpartan), is a Canadian-born American professional League of Legends player, currently playing for 100 Thieves in the NA Challengers League.  He is most known for his four and a half year long tenure as Counter Logic Gaming's top laner from November 2014–May 2019, a time during which CLG and ZionSpartan made both the 2015 World Championship and the 2016 World Championship.  ZionSpartan and CLG also won the 2015 NALCS Summer Split as well as the 2016 NALCS Spring Split.  From the start of his career to November 2015, Upadhyaya played under the screenname ZionSpartan; from November 2015–2019, he played under the screenname Darshan; in 2020 he resumed playing as ZionSpartan; and in 2021 he has returned to Darshan.

Darshan was elected the inaugural president of the LCS Players Association in 2018, a loose union-like advocacy organization that represents the interests of contracted players in the LCS, and continues to hold that position as of 2022.

Early life 
Upadhyaya was born on November 12, 1994. He resided in Poway, California before joining professional esports.

While growing up, Upadhyaya was often called by his peers his in-game name, ZionSpartan.  This was branded by the NALCS in a video titled "Even his teacher called him ZionSpartan."

Tournament results

Counter Logic Gaming 
 1st – 2015 Summer NA LCS 
 12–13th – 2015 League of Legends World Championship
 2nd – IEM X San Jose
 1st – 2016 Spring NA LCS 
 2nd – 2016 Mid-Season Invitational
 4th – 2016 NA LCS Summer regular season
 4th – 2016 NA LCS Summer playoffs

References 

League of Legends top lane players
Counter Logic Gaming players
Dignitas (esports) players
Golden Guardians players
Team Curse players
American esports players
Canadian expatriates in the United States
People from Poway, California
Living people
1994 births